The Magistrate  is a 1959  Italian-language drama film directed by Luigi Zampa. It was a co-production with Spain and France. Spaniard José Suárez stars in the film, which was shot in Madrid (exterior locations Plaza de España, Plaza Mayor, Parque del Oeste), with a French, Italian and Spanish cast. The name of the Italian city where the action takes place is never mentioned.

A 21-year-old Claudia Cardinale played the role of Orlando's wife in the film.

Cast
 José Suárez: Andrea Morandi
 François Périer: Luigi Bonelli
 Jacqueline Sassard: Carla Bonelli
 Massimo Serato: Ugo 
 Luis Seigner:  Procuratore
 Maurizio Arena: Orlando Di Giovanni
 Claudia Cardinale: Maria 
 Ignazio Balsamo: Capitano di nave 
 Geronimo Meynier: Pierino Lucchi

External links 
 

1959 films
Films set in Italy
1950s Italian-language films
1959 drama films
Italian black-and-white films
Spanish black-and-white films
Madrid in fiction
Films directed by Luigi Zampa
Italian drama films
Films scored by Renzo Rossellini
Spanish drama films
1950s Italian films